Andrew Cunningham Scott (born 16 February 1952) is a British geologist, and professor emeritus at Royal Holloway University of London. He won the 2007 Gilbert H. Cady Award from the Geological Society of America for outstanding contributions to coal geology. He is widely regarded an expert on wildfire and charcoal and has highlighted the role of fire in deep time. He also contributes as a palaeobotanist and science communicator.

Scott was educated at Cannon Lane Primary School, (Pinner); St. Martins School, Northwood; Merchant Taylors' School, Northwood; and the University of London, where he obtained a B.Sc. (Bedford College) and a Ph.D. (Birkbeck College) studying under William Gilbert Chaloner. His thesis concerned the palaeoecology of Carboniferous Coal Measure plants. After a 2-year post-doctoral fellowship at Trinity College, Dublin, he returned to England to take up a lectureship in Geology at Chelsea College, University of London. During this period, his research concentrated on the Lower Carboniferous floras of Scotland including those from the Pettycur Volcanics and the East Kirkton Quarry.

In 1985, the geology departments at Chelsea College and Bedford College merged to form a new department at Royal Holloway, University of London. He was awarded a personal chair in 1996, becoming Professor of Applied Palaeobotany. During the 1990s, he worked on Drawings and Prints in the Royal Library that had been collected by Cassiano dal Pozzo. These were part of a project undertaken by Federico Cesi and Francesco Stelluti, founders of the Accademia dei Linceii. His book on the drawing of fossil woods was launched by Charles, Prince of Wales at Windsor Castle in 2005.

From 1998 to 2006, he was the Director of Science Communication. He was awarded a D.Sc. from the University of London for his published research. In 2003, he was made an Honorary Professor at Jilin University, Changchun, China. He was a visiting professor at Yale University in 2006–2007 and a visiting fellow at Berkeley College. During this period, his research concentrated on the occurrence of wildfire in deep time. He also became involved with the Pyrogeography research group at the University of California, Santa Barbara and published several important papers and a book on Fire on Earth.
In 2012 he became a distinguished research fellow and was awarded a Leverhulme Fellowship and became the Emeritus Professor of Geology in 2014.

Scott has been involved in many radio broadcasts including In Our Time and was the subject of a BBC documentary about his research on coal for screenhouse productions and the Open University. 
He has been in writing articles on geology stamps and has had a long-term collaboration with the artist Nick Shrewing working on geological stamp designs for a number of countries including the Solomon Islands, Barbados, Ascension Island and Tristan da Cunha.

Scott is the recipient of several awards including the Presidents Award of the Geological Society of London and the Gilbert H. Cady Award from the Geological Society of America. He is also a Fellow of the Geological Society of London, Fellow of the Geological Society of America, Fellow of the Royal Society of Arts, Fellow of the Higher Education Academy and is a Chartered Geologist.

Personal life 
He is married to his wife Anne and has a son and a daughter.

Selected publications

Books

 Scott, A. C. 1987. Coal and coal-bearing strata: Recent advances.  (http://sp.lyellcollection.org/content/32/1) Geological Society of London Special Publication 32. (Editor).
 Collinson, M.E. and Scott, A.C. (Eds) 1993. Studies in Palaeobotany and Palynology in Honour of Professor W.G. Chaloner F.R.S. Special Papers in Palaeontology 49,1–187. ( http://www.palass.org/beta/eps/shop/product/pid-82/)
 Scott, A.C. and Fleet, A.J. (Eds) 1994. Coal and Coal-bearing strata as oil prone source rocks? Geological Society of London, Special Publication 77. 213pp. ( http://sp.lyellcollection.org/content/77/1)
 Blundell, D.J. and Scott, A.C. (eds) 1998. Lyell: The Past is the Key to the Present. Geological Society Special Publication 143, 376pp. ( http://sp.lyellcollection.org/content/143/1)
 Scott, A.C. and Freedberg, D. 2000. The Paper Museum of Cassiano dal Pozzo: A Catalogue Raisonné.Series B. Part III. Fossil woods and other geological specimens. Harvey Miller Publishers, London. 427pp. ( https://www.amazon.com/Fossil-Geological-Specimens-MUSEUM-CASSIANO/dp/1872501915)
 Scott, A.C., Bowman, D.J.M.S., Bond, W.J., Pyne, S.J. and Alexander M. 2014. Fire on Earth: An Introduction. (http://eu.wiley.com/WileyCDA/WileyTitle/productCd-111995357X.html ) J. Wiley and Sons. 413pp.

Scientific Papers

 
 
 
 
 

 
 
 Scott, A.C.2000. Art and the Earth sciences. pp. 38–43. In: Hancock, P.L. and Skinner, B.J (eds). The Oxford Companion to the Earth. Oxford University Press, Oxford.  http://www.oxfordreference.com/view/10.1093/acref/9780198540397.001.0001/acref-9780198540397-e-37?rskey=wRv7A3&result=37
 Scott, A.C.  2000. Palaeobotany. p. 774. In: Hancock, P.L. and Skinner, B.J (eds). The Oxford Companion to the Earth. Oxford University Press, Oxford.  http://www.oxfordreference.com/view/10.1093/acref/9780198540397.001.0001/acref-9780198540397-e-661?rskey=okw9tr&result=661
	Scott, A.C. 2000. Fossil plants. pp. 364–371. In: Hancock, P.L. and Skinner, B.J. (eds). The Oxford Companion to the Earth. Oxford University Press, Oxford.  http://www.oxfordreference.com/view/10.1093/acref/9780198540397.001.0001/acref-9780198540397-e-313?rskey=tBNiRt&result=313
 
 
 
 
 
 
 
 
 
 
 
 
 Boslough, M., Nicoll, K., Holliday, V., Daulton, T.L., Meltzer, D., Pinter, N., Scott, A.C., Surovell, T., Claeys, Ph., Gill, J., Paquay, F., Marlon, J., Bartlein, P., Whitlock, C., Grayson, D. and Jull, T.  2012. Arguments and Evidence against a Younger Dryas Impact Event. pp. 13–26.  In: Giosan, L.; D.Q. Fuller; K. Nicoll; R. Flad and P.D. Clift. (editors) Climates, Landscapes and Civilizations. Geophys. Monogr. Ser., vol. 198, AGU, Washington, D. C., .

References

External links
Royal Holloway University biography
Fire on Earth

1952 births
Living people
British geologists
Academics of Royal Holloway, University of London
Alumni of Bedford College, London
Alumni of Birkbeck, University of London
Academics of Trinity College Dublin
Academics of the University of the Arts London